The Halifax and South Western Railway  was a historic Canadian railway operating in the province of Nova Scotia.

The legal name of this railway was the Halifax & South Western Railway, as is defined in various Acts of the Nova Scotia Legislature, such as 1902 c.1, Act respecting the Halifax & South Western Railway Co.. However, Halifax & Southwestern Railway is also sometimes also used.

The H&SW was created in spring 1901 when William Mackenzie and Donald Mann approached the provincial government with plans to finish the abortive plans for a railway from Halifax to Yarmouth along the province's South Shore. For many years, the line had significant curvature throughout its length, a result of the rugged local topography, which earned it the moniker, "Hellish Slow & Wobbly".

Predecessors
The H&SW was not the first railway to build on the South Shore of Nova Scotia, as various charters for railway companies had preceded it.

The Nova Scotia Central Railway (NSCR) had opened its line between Middleton in the Annapolis Valley and Lunenburg, by way of Bridgewater, on December 23, 1889.

In 1893, the Coast Railway Company of Nova Scotia was incorporated under a charter to build a narrow gauge line between Yarmouth and Lockeport, by way of Barrington and Shelburne. Construction took place very slowly and what little trackage had been already built was converted to standard gauge in 1895. In 1899 the company was renamed the Halifax and Yarmouth Railway (H&YR) and received a new charter to build east from Lockeport to Liverpool, Bridgewater and Halifax. By 1903 the line had barely reached Barrington.

The Liverpool and Milton Tramway also built a short railway up the Mersey River valley between Liverpool and a pulp mill near Milton in Queens County in 1896, opening on February 1, 1897. It was renamed the Liverpool and Milton Railway (L&MR) in 1900.

Mergers and construction

The H&SW was created in spring 1901 when Mackenzie and Mann approached the provincial government with plans to finish the abortive plans for a railway from the City of Halifax to Yarmouth. Experienced railway engineers, MacKenzie and Mann already owned 2,000 miles in track in Canada by this time. On July 1, 1902, the H&SW purchased the NSCR with its line from Mahone Bay to Bridgewater, forming part of the new mainline between Bridgewater and Halifax. The new construction between Halifax and Mahone Bay was completed by 1904.

On April 11, 1903, the H&SW purchased the Nova Scotia Southern Railway (NSSR). The NSSR had no trackage constructed, however it did have a charter to build from the NSCR at New Germany to Caledonia in what was rich timber territory. Upon acquiring the NSSR charter, the H&SW built the 22 miles of track over the following months, with the first train reaching Caledonia on July 1, 1904.

In April 1905, the H&SW purchased the L&MR, with a short section of that line forming part of the main line between Bridgewater and Barrington. The new construction between Bridgewater and Barrington was completed later that year. In 1905, the H&SW also purchased the H&YR with major upgrades being done to this line between Barrington and Yarmouth over the next year.

Also in 1905, the H&SW purchased the charter for the incomplete Middleton and Victoria Beach Railway (M&VBR) in the western Annapolis Valley. The 40 mile M&VBR line was opened by the H&SW to connect an iron ore mine at Torbrook, near Middleton on the NSCR, with port facilities at Port Wade on Annapolis Basin.

Canadian Northern
Construction was completed in 1906 and H&SW tracks joined the Intercolonial Railway's mainline in Halifax at Southwestern Junction at Africville and ran into the Intercolonial's North Street Station. On December 19, 1906, the first H&SW through train reached Yarmouth from Halifax. At some point after the completion of the H&SW in 1906, the system was merged into Mackenze and Mann's Canadian Northern Railway (CNoR) transcontinental system. The H&SW, along with the Inverness Railway, were isolated from the rest of CNoR's trackage which ran from Montreal to Vancouver, not unlike rival Canadian Pacific Railway's Dominion Atlantic Railway.

The CNoR, along with several other railway lines in Canada, entered financial difficulties during the First World War. Encumbered by construction debts and low traffic, the CNoR was bankrupt and requested financial aid from the federal government in 1918. On September 6, 1918, CNoR was nationalized and placed under a Board of Management by the Department of Railways and Canals. On December 20, 1918, CNoR, along with the Canadian Government Railways were placed under a new company named Canadian National Railways (CNR).

Canadian National
Under CNR, the H&SW trackage saw significant infrastructure improvements to ballast, drainage, sleeper ties, rails, switches and bridges. The line still had significant curvature throughout, a result of the rugged local topography on the South Shore (locals called the H&SW the "Hellish Slow & Wobbly"), but the improvements brought respectable track speeds and service improvements.

The Intercolonial Railway / Canadian Government Railways Halifax terminal trackage inherited by CNR underwent significant change in the late 1910s with the construction and opening of a new south-end terminal and station in 1920. The project saw a massive railway cut built across the isthmus of the Halifax Peninsula which affected the H&SW tracks that connected with the ICR mainline near Africville. In 1921, the Halifax end of the H&SW was shifted to join the new alignment in the rock cut by constructing what became known as "Southwestern Junction" in the community of Fairview, adjacent to a large new roundhouse complex.

In the years before the domination of publicly funded highways, the H&SW formed a critical transportation link between the various communities, as well as steam ship connections at Yarmouth (to Boston and New York) and Halifax (to Europe).

In the 1920s, the former M&VBR line was proving uneconomic after the closure of iron ore mines at Torbrook and the port at Port Wade. CNR applied in 1925 to abandon west of Middleton, but permission was given to abandon only west of Bridgetown. By 1928, bridges were removed and trackage would be removed in the following years.

The construction of the large Bowater Mersey Paper Company Limited mill at Brooklyn in 1929 led to more traffic from the Liverpool area. Shipyards in Liverpool and Shelburne lent some traffic, as did various saw mills and logging operations at locations between Yarmouth and Halifax and between Bridgewater and Middleton/Bridgetown and New Germany to Caledonia. The naval base HMCS Shelburne opened on Shelburne Harbour during the Second World War, requiring construction of a short 1 mile spur. Heating oil and gasoline distribution terminals operated by various oil companies in communities along the lines. A distillery in Bridgetown generated some traffic, as did a forest products plant in East River. In the early 1980s a large Michelin tire factory opened in Bridgewater and required rail service. The development of the Lakeside Industrial Park near the Beechville area in the 1960s create several large industrial customers. One of them, a Volvo assembly plant attracted steady strings of autorack cars until it closed in 1998.

Decline
CN passenger service ended on the South Shore on Saturday October 25, 1969, and its stations fell into disuse. The historic H&SW passenger station in Bridgewater was destroyed by an unexplained fire on December 22, 1982.

CN's former H&SW lines on Nova Scotia's South Shore and in the Annapolis Valley were proving uneconomic by the early 1980s, even for freight service. In 1982, permission was given to abandon the far end of the mainline from Liverpool to Yarmouth as well as the branch line of the former NSCR line between Bridgewater and Bridgetown via Middleton, as well as the New Germany to Caledonia. Reduced to a line running from Halifax to Liverpool, CN depended on the Bowater paper mill and the Michelin tire plant, but even these customers were unable to keep the line generating positive income.

By the late 1980s, CN was given permission to abandon the remaining line from Bridgewater to Liverpool as the Bowater pulp mill in Liverpool shifted its transportation to ocean shipping and trucks. At Bridgewater, CN built a small yard on the east side of the Lahave River and sold its extensive former yard property to a shopping mall developer. In the early 1990s, even that trackage was eliminated, as Michelin began to use trucks to service its plant and CN's last remaining customer in Lunenburg County was the forest products company at East River.

In 1993 the former H&SW trackage was abandoned west of Halifax's Lakeside Industrial Park, leaving only a 7-mile spur as the last reminder of this once important railway network in southern Nova Scotia.  Called the Chester Spur in its employee timetable, CN freight operations to the Bayers Lake Industrial Park and Lakeside Industrial Park were focused on serving a cement depot, a scrap dealer and several other customers through a team track. In 2006, as part of its "Three-Year Rail Network Plan", CN declared its intention to discontinue service on the Chester Spur, this being the last remaining portion of the original H&SW trackage. The last freight trains operated on the spur west of Southwestern Junction through to the Lakeside Industrial Park in late 2007. The rail corridor was purchased by the Halifax Regional Municipality and by October 2009, rails at level crossings were lifted and paved over and by September 2010, all the remaining track of the CN Chester Spur had been removed and replaced by a rail trail (paved recreational pathway).

Preservation
The railway's history is preserved at the Halifax and Southwestern Railway Museum in Lunenburg, Nova Scotia.
In addition to the network of recreational trails built on the former H&SW roadbed, several stations have survived and been given alternative use. They include the French Village station, which is now a cafe and the Liverpool station which is the Hank Snow museum. The Chester stn. exists today as a tourist bureau, Oak Island museum and art gallery, and farmer's market.

References

External links

Halifax and Southwestern Railway Museum homepage
Halifax and Southwestern Railway Museum on Youtube
Halifax and Southwestern Railway Museum on Facebook
History of Railway Companies in Nova Scotia 
Photographs of the H&SW Gold River bridge in Lunenburg County 
Photographs of the H&SW Martins River bridge in Lunenburg County
Halifax & Southwestern Railway Digital Preservation Initiative - Wiki
Dominion Atlantic Railway Digital Preservation Initiative - Wiki, Middleton Interchange

Bridgewater, Nova Scotia
Defunct Nova Scotia railways
Predecessors of the Canadian Northern Railway
Transport in Halifax, Nova Scotia
Transport in Lunenburg County, Nova Scotia
Transport in the Region of Queens Municipality
Transport in Shelburne County, Nova Scotia
Transport in Annapolis County, Nova Scotia
Railway companies established in 1901
Railway companies disestablished in 1906
Canadian companies established in 1901